A five days music event is held annually at the Folk Music Center in Siglufjordur, northern Iceland. The festival commences on the first Wednesday of July every year.

The main focus is on Icelandic folk music and Scandinavian folk music as well as world music and folk dances. 15-20 concerts are held in different locations of the town, f.e. the church, locals and the Herring Era Museum. During the festival, workshops on music and old handcraft, and lectures on both Icelandic and foreign topics are held.

The Folk Music Center of Siglufjordur also organizes a Folk Music Academy in conjunction with the University of Iceland, to coincide with the Folk Music Festival. The main topics of the Academy are different types of Icelandic traditional and folk music, including rimur, tvisöngur, children’s rhymes and psalms. Icelandic folk dances are also to be introduced, as well as folk music arrangements, vocal improvisation and instrumental tradition.

The artistic director of the festival from 2005 to present is Gunnsteinn Olafsson.

History
The first festival was organized in the year 2000 by Reykjavik European Capital of Culture, Siglufjordur town council and a group of people interested in founding a Folk Music Center in Siglufjordur.

Awards

In 2005 the festival was awarded the  "Eyrarros" award by the President of Iceland for outstanding cultural achievement in the countryside.

In 2012 the Folk Music Center received a special award from Katrín Jakobsdóttir the Minister of Education, Science and Culture for its contribution to Icelandic culture on the Icelandic Language Day.

Performances

Among artists that have given concerts at the Folk Music Festival in Siglufjord are Steindór Andersen, Sigur Rós, Bára Grímsdóttir and Chris Foster, Ensemble Unicorn, Astri Skarpengland, Jerry Rockwell,  Susanne Lundeng, Tómas R. Einarsson, Björn Thoroddsen, Eddie Walker, Minna Raskinen, Spilmenn Ríkinis, Marit Steinsrud and Stein Villa, Sturm und Drang, Voces Thules, Maria and Olof Misgeld, Tranotra amongst many others.

References
The Library of Reykjavík

Reykjavik Art Festival - Eyrarrosin
The Ministry of Education, Science and Culture

External links
 The Folk Music Festival of Siglufjordur (Official website)
 Siglufjord and Olafsfjord (official website)
 The Herring Era Museum
 The University of Iceland, Icelandic and Comparative Cultural Studies

Icelandic culture
Music festivals in Iceland
Folk festivals in Iceland
Summer events in Iceland